Spalacopsis protensa is a species of beetle in the family Cerambycidae. It was described by Pascoe in 1871.

References

Spalacopsis
Beetles described in 1871